Group A of the 2012 Fed Cup Europe/Africa Zone Group III was one of two pools in the Europe/Africa zone of the 2012 Fed Cup. Five teams competed in a round robin competition, with the top two teams and the bottom teams proceeding to their respective sections of the play-offs: the top teams played for advancement to the Group II.

Armenia vs. Kenya

Ireland vs. Malta

Morocco vs. Kenya

Armenia vs. Malta

Morocco vs. Ireland

Malta vs. Kenya

Morocco vs. Malta

Armenia vs. Ireland

Morocco vs. Armenia

Ireland vs. Kenya

See also
Fed Cup structure

References

External links
 Fed Cup website

2012 Fed Cup Europe/Africa Zone